Avante is a centrist Brazilian political party. It was founded in 1989 by dissidents of the Brazilian Labour Party (PTB) as the Labour Party of Brazil (Partido Trabalhista do Brasil, PTdoB) and is a minor force in Brazilian politics.

History 
In 1998, the party chose João de Deus Barbosa as its Presidential candidate; he received 200,000 votes (0.2%). In the legislative election of 2006, the party elected one representative to the Federal Chamber, and had 0.3% of the national votes (311,000 votes) for the parliament. In the legislative election of 2010 this increased to three representatives and 0.7% of the national vote (642,422 votes). At the 2014 election, the party won two seats and 0.85% of the vote in the Chamber of Deputies; it gained one seat following the defection of Silvio Costa from the Social Christian Party. The party has 534 local councillors and controls 26 mayoralties. PTdoB voted in favor of the impeachment of Dilma Rousseff.

In 2017, PTdoB changed its name to Avante, Portuguese for 'Forward'. For the Brazilian general election of 2018, Avante joined the 'Sovereign Brazil' coalition, together with the Democratic Labour Party, in support of PDT candidate Ciro Gomes. Gomes obtained 12.47% of the votes, finishing third.

The party saw an increase of votes in the parliamentary vote, electing 7 deputies; however, it failed to elect any senator. Following the election, Avante did not go into opposition like PTD, but remained neutral towards president Jair Bolsonaro. In the 2022 election Avante supported the centre-left candidate Luiz Inácio "Lula" da Silva (Workers' Party, PT); the party increased its representation to 7 Deputies in such election.

Electoral results

Legislative elections

See also 
 :Category:Avante (political party) politicians

References 

1989 establishments in Brazil
Centrist parties in Brazil
Labour parties
Political parties established in 1989
Political parties in Brazil